Ronald Gajraj (April 1952 - December 2018) was a Guyanese politician who served as the Minister of Home Affairs. He was a member of the People's Progressive Party.

Biography 
Gajraj was a Lieutenant in the Guyana Defence Force, an attorney, the Minister of Home Affairs, and the Ambassador to India and Bangladesh. He came from a family that served in the government since the inception of the PPP in 1950.

Gajraj was appointed Minister of Home Affairs by Janet Jagan, on January 1999, and served until May 2005. He resigned amid accusations of heading a death squad, formed in response to the increase in crime following the February 23, 2002 Camp Street Jailbreak.

In 2002, they were rumours of a government supported death squad that was responsible for the extra judicial murders of numerous wanted men. In October 2003, George Bacchus, a self proclaimed member of the death squad, accused Gajraj of providing support. Bacchus was murdered on June 24, 2004, before he could testify under oath. Gajraj stepped down as Home Affairs Minister, calling for a commission of inquiry. The commission cleared Gajraj due to a lack of evidence, but found that he had an inappropriate relationship with organized crime and had interfered in issuing firearm licenses. Gajraj was reappointed Home Affair Minister, but objections from the opposition party and foreign governments led to his removal. Gail Teixeira replaced Gajraj as Home Affairs Minister. Gajraj was mentioned in the Wikileaks revelations, eventually suing fellow former PPP minister Gail Texeira and the Guyana Chronicle for libel. 

In 2005, he was appointed Guyana's High Commissioner to India, in 2015, he was also appointed Guyana's High Commissioner to Bangladesh. He served in both roles until after the 2015 Guyanese general election.

Gajraj died on 15 December 2018 following a short illness.

References 

1950s births
2018 deaths
Political scandals
Guyanese politicians of Indian descent
People's Progressive Party (Guyana) politicians
Government ministers of Guyana
Guyanese political people